Delanterone (developmental code name GBR-21162), also known as 1α-methylandrosta-4,16-dien-3-one, is a steroidal antiandrogen described as an anti-acne agent which was never marketed. The compound showed poor efficacy as an antiandrogen in vivo in animals, suggestive of low activity or a short terminal half-life, and likely in relation to this was not further developed. It was described and characterized in the literature in 1977.

See also 
 Steroidal antiandrogen
 List of steroidal antiandrogens

References 

Androstanes
Anti-acne preparations
Cyclopentenes
Steroidal antiandrogens